Alberto Di Bernardo (born 4 November 1980 in Rosario, Argentina) is an Italian/Argentine rugby union player, who gained four caps for  in 2013. He played club rugby for Treviso in Celtic League, Leeds Carnegie in Premiership Rugby and for Bourgoin in the Top 14. His usual position is at fly-half and he has played for Italy A.

He played for Italy ‘A’ in the side that were beaten by Tonga 33-27 in November 2005, his kicking helping to keep up the pressure on Tonga.

In 2007 he started his life as a Leeds Carnegie player and secured them a place in the top flight of English rugby, the Guinness Premiership. After bouncing back between the top and second division, he decided to leave Leeds behind and take on the challenge of playing for Bourgoin in the Top 14.

References and notes

1980 births
Living people
Rugby union fly-halves
Argentine rugby union players
Italian rugby union players
Sportspeople from Rosario, Santa Fe
Benetton Rugby players
Leeds Tykes players
Cornish Pirates players
CS Bourgoin-Jallieu players
Italy international rugby union players